Abdallah Khaled Sheikh (born 10 April 1998), is a Qatari born-Yemeni professional footballer who plays as a forward for Qatar Stars League side Umm Salal.

References

External links
 

1998 births
Living people
Qatari footballers
Naturalised citizens of Qatar
Qatari people of Yemeni descent
Association football forwards
Umm Salal SC players
Muaither SC players
Qatar Stars League players
Qatari Second Division players